Pomian is a Polish coat of arms. It was used by several szlachta families in the times of the Polish–Lithuanian Commonwealth.

History
On the shield is the black head of a bison on a yellow field, with a sword driven into the head so that both the top and the bottom of the sword are visible. Above the helmet on the crown is an arm in armor with a bare hand holding a sword.

The origin of this coat-of-arms can be traced back to 1279, when Hebda, brother of Jaranda, performed public deeds of merit to atone for the sins of his murdered brother. One of his brave acts was the killing of a bison that had been plaguing the village of Lubania. During the reign of Walter II, King of Poland, the bison head was placed on the shield and the arm with a sword was placed above the crown and was named Pomian. This is a communal coat-of-arms and is shared by other Great Polish Families.

Blazon
The Pomian coat of arms, being borne by multiple families, as with most Polish armorial bearings, has multiple variations to the basic design.  The design as shown in the example image on this page may be blazoned as follows:Arms: Or, a buffalo's head caboshed, sable, pierced with a sword, proper.  Mantling: Sable, doubled Or. Crest: Out of a ducal coronet, an arm embowed in armor holding in its hand a sword, proper.

Notable bearers
Notable bearers of this coat of arms include:
Bohdan Andrejewicz Sakowicz
Alfred Niezychowski
Stanislaw Kobierzycki, Kasztelan Gdański, Author and Historian, Gdansk, Poland b.1600-d.1665.
Wladyslaw Aleksander Lubienski, Primate of Poland
Swietoslaw Jana Kobierzycki, Canon Cathedral Plock.
Zophia Kobierzycka, consort to Stefan Czarniecki.
Jaroslaw Kobierzycki.
Krzysztof Kosinski, Polish Noble and leader of Kosinski Uprising.
Maciej Łubieński, Primate of Poland and Interrex
Feliks Lubienski, Justice Minister in the Grand Duchy of Warsaw
Tomasz Lubienski, General and industrialist
Bernard Łubieński, Redemptorist preacher and missionary 
Lech Kaczyński
Rula Lenska, actor

See also
 Polish heraldry
 Heraldry
 Coat of arms

External links 
  Pomian Coat of Arms and bearers.

References

Sources
 Dynastic Genealogy
 Ornatowski.com

Pomian
Coats of arms with bison